Dynasty is an American television series based on the 1980s prime time soap opera of the same name. Developed by Josh Schwartz, Stephanie Savage, and Sallie Patrick, the first season of the new series stars Elizabeth Gillies as Fallon Carrington, Grant Show as her father Blake Carrington, Nathalie Kelley as Blake's new wife Cristal, and James Mackay as his son Steven, with Robert Christopher Riley as chauffeur Michael Culhane, Sam Adegoke as tech billionaire Jeff Colby, Rafael de la Fuente as Sam "Sammy Jo" Jones, Cristal's nephew and Steven's fiancé, and Alan Dale as Joseph Anders, the Carrington majordomo. The series later introduced Alexis Carrington (Nicollette Sheridan and Elaine Hendrix), Blake's ex-wife and the estranged mother of Steven and Fallon; Anders's daughter Kirby (Maddison Brown); Blake's third wife Cristal Jennings (Ana Brenda Contreras and Daniella Alonso); Blake and Alexis's long-missing son, Adam Carrington (Sam Underwood); Blake's half-sister Dominique Deveraux (Michael Michele), the mother of Jeff and Monica Colby (Wakeema Hollis); Fallon's husband Liam Ridley (Adam Huber); and Amanda Carrington (Eliza Bennett), Alexis's secret daughter by Blake.

The pilot was announced in September 2016, and the reboot received a series order in May 2017. Dynasty premiered on October 11, 2017, on The CW in the United States, and on Netflix internationally the following day. On November 8, 2017, The CW picked up the series for a full season of 22 episodes. On April 2, 2018, The CW renewed the series for a second season, which premiered on October 12, 2018. Dynasty was renewed for a third season on January 31, 2019, which premiered on October 11, 2019. Dynasty was renewed for a fourth season on January 7, 2020, which premiered on May 7, 2021. On February 3, 2021, ahead of its fourth season premiere, The CW renewed the series for a fifth season.

Series overview

Episodes

Season 1 (2017–18)

Season 2 (2018–19)

Season 3 (2019–20)

Season 4 (2021)

Season 5 (2021–22)

Ratings

References

External links
 
 

Episode list using the default LineColor
List
Lists of American drama television series episodes
Lists of soap opera episodes